Delphi I, Solo Piano Improvisations is an album recorded by Chick Corea and released in 1979.

Track listing 
All music composed by Chick Corea.

Side one
"Delphi I" – 3:16
"Delphi II" – 0:42
"Delphi III" – 1:09
"Delphi IV" – 2:43
"Delphi V" – 0:54
"Delphi VI" – 1:41
"Delphi VII" – 2:05
"Delphi VIII" – 1:20
"Children's Song #20" – 4:53
"Stride Time I" – 1:59

Side two
"Stride Time II (Soft Stride)" – 5:35
"Stride Time III (Soft Stride)" – 2:52
Stride Time IV (Stride Bop)" – 3:55
Stride Time V (Mr. T)" – 1:05
Stride Time VI (Stride Out)" – 1:18
Stride Time VII (Rhapsody for Mr. T)" – 8:45

Personnel 
 Chick Corea – Piano

Chart performance

See also 
 Delphi II & III (Polydor, 1980)

References 

1979 albums
Chick Corea albums
Polydor Records albums